Synagrops is a genus of temperate ocean-basses native to the Indian, Atlantic and Pacific oceans.

Species
There are currently 2 recognized species in this genus:
 Synagrops bellus (Goode & T. H. Bean, 1896) (Blackmouth bass)
 Synagrops japonicus (Döderlein (de), 1883) (Blackmouth splitfin)

References

 
Acropomatidae
Perciformes genera
Taxa named by Albert Günther